Panmure Island is a Canadian rural community in Lot 61 township in Kings County, Prince Edward Island.

The community is situated upon Panmure Island and derives its name from this island.

The community is home to several year-round residents but hosts numerous visitors in the summer months when its many cottages are fully occupied.

References

Communities in Kings County, Prince Edward Island